European Youth Chess Championship 2018 was a Swiss-system tournaments in Riga, to decide the European Youth individuals chess champions in U8 — U18 age categories.

Tournament 
At the European Chess Union (ECU) General Assembly during the 42nd Chess Olympiad in Baku in September 2016, the organizational rights to the European Youth Chess Championship 2018 were awarded to Latvia, who held the event in Riga from 19 to 30 August 2018, under the auspices of European Chess Union. The venue for the championship was the International Exhibition Centre Ķīpsala (Riga, Ķīpsalas Street 8) near the historical center of Riga. The main organizers from Latvia were the President of the Latvian Chess Federation Āris Ozoliņs and tournament director Egons Lavendelis. The chief arbiter of the tournament was Ashot Vardapetyan (Armenia), the deputy chief arbiters are Andra Cimiņa, Vairis Kurpnieks (both Latvia) and Christos Pilalis (Greece). The championship consisted of 12 separate tournaments: Open (boy) tournaments in the age groups O08, O10, O12, O14, O16, O18 and the Girls' tournaments in the age groups G08, G10, G12, G14, G16, G18, all of which hold on Swiss-system in 9 rounds with time control for each player: 90 minutes for 40 moves plus 30 minutes for the rest of the game with an increment of 30 seconds per move, starting from move one. The championship was attended by 1072 participants from 47 countries, including 426 participants in Girls' tournaments and 646 participants in Open tournaments. In connection with the exclusion of the chess federation of Bulgaria from FIDE, all participants from Bulgaria represented the European Chess Union at the tournament. 194 participants had various international chess titles, including one Grandmaster (GM), 10 International Masters (IM), 6 Women International Masters (WIM) and 76 FIDE masters (FM). Larger delegation have Russia, which one represented 150 players, but second one Latvia was represented by 103 participants, including 29 participants in girls' tournaments and 74 participants in open tournaments. Latvia's representation was the second largest championship behind Russia, represented by 150 members. At the end of the tournament Russia takes home 7 gold, 6 silver and 3 bronze medals. Azerbaijan leaves Riga with 2 gold medals, while Belarus – with 1 gold and 1 silver and 3 bronze medals.

G08 tournament 
In Girl's G08 tournament participated 50 players.

{| class="wikitable" style="text-align: left"
|+ G08 winners
|-																
! Place !! Name !! Points
|-
| 1 || ||7½
|-
| 2 ||  || 7 
|-
| 3 ||  || 6½ 
|-
| 4 ||  || 6½ 
|-
| 5 ||  || 6½ 
|}

G10 tournament 
In Girl's G10 tournament participated 71 players. In the first five places were occupied by Russian representatives.

{| class="wikitable" style="text-align: left"
|+ G10 winners
|-																
! Place !! Name !! Points
|-
| 1 ||  || 8 
|-
| 2 ||  || 7½ 
|-
| 3 ||  || 7 
|-
| 4 ||  || 7 
|-
| 5 ||  || 6½ 
|}

G12 tournament 
In Girl's G12 tournament participated 82 players. The first place was divided into four players, of which the best tie break criteries was the Russian representative.

{| class="wikitable" style="text-align: left"
|+ G12 winners
|-																
! Place !! Name !! Points
|-
| 1 ||  || 7 
|-
| 2 ||  || 7 
|-
| 3 ||  || 7 
|-
| 4 ||  || 7 
|-
| 5 ||  || 6½ 
|}

G14 tournament 
In Girl's G14 tournament participated 92 players.

{| class="wikitable" style="text-align: left"
|+ G14 winners
|-																
! Place !! Name !! Points
|-
| 1 ||  || 8 
|-
| 2 ||  || 7 
|-
| 3 ||  || 7 
|-
| 4 ||  || 7 
|-
| 5 ||  || 6½ 
|}

G16 tournament 
In Girl's G16 tournament participated 65 players.

{| class="wikitable" style="text-align: left"
|+ G16 winners
|-																
! Place !! Name !! Points
|-
| 1 ||  || 7½ 
|-
| 2 ||  || 6½ 
|-
| 3 ||  || 6½ 
|-
| 4 ||  || 6½ 
|-
| 5 ||  || 6½ 
|}

G18 tournament 
In Girl's G18 tournament participated 66 players.

{| class="wikitable" style="text-align: left"
|+ G18 winners
|-																
! Place !! Name !! Points
|-
| 1 ||  || 8
|-
| 2 ||  || 7
|-
| 3 ||  || 7 
|-
| 4 ||  || 6½ 
|-
| 5 ||  || 6½ 
|}

O08 tournament 
In Open's O08 tournament participated 77 players.

{| class="wikitable" style="text-align: left"
|+ O08 winners
|-																
! Place !! Name !! Points
|-
| 1 ||  || 8 
|-
| 2 ||  || 7½ 
|-
| 3 ||  || 7 
|-
| 4 ||  || 7 
|-
| 5 ||  || 6½ 
|}

O10 tournament 
In Open's O10 tournament participated 132 players. The first place was divided into three players, of which the best tie break criteries was the Russian representative.

{| class="wikitable" style="text-align: left"
|+ O10 winners
|-																
! Place !! Name !! Points
|-
| 1 ||  || 7½ 
|-
| 2 ||  || 7½ 
|-
| 3 ||  || 7½ 
|-
| 4 ||  || 7 
|-
| 5 ||  || 7 
|}

O12 tournament 
In Open's O12 tournament participated 124 players.

{| class="wikitable" style="text-align: left"
|+ O12 winners
|-																
! Place !! Name !! Points
|-
| 1 ||  || 8
|-
| 2 ||  || 7
|-
| 3 ||  || 7 
|-
| 4 ||  || 7 
|-
| 5 ||  || 7 
|}

O14 tournament 
In Open's O14 tournament participated 125 players.

{| class="wikitable" style="text-align: left"
|+ O14 winners
|-																
! Place !! Name !! Points
|-
| 1 ||  || 8 
|-
| 2 ||  || 7½
|-
| 3 ||  || 6½ 
|-
| 4 ||  || 6½ 
|-
| 5 ||  || 6½ 
|}

O16 tournament 
In Open's O16 tournament participated 113 players.

{| class="wikitable" style="text-align: left"
|+ O16 winners
|-																
! Place !! Name !! Points
|-
| 1 ||  || 7½ 
|-
| 2 ||  || 7
|-
| 3 ||  || 7 
|-
| 4 ||  || 7 
|-
| 5 ||  || 7 
|}

O18 tournament 
In Open's O16 tournament participated 75 players.

{| class="wikitable" style="text-align: left"
|+ O18 winners
|-																
! Place !! Name !! Points
|-
| 1 ||  || 7½ 
|-
| 2 ||  || 6½
|-
| 3 ||  || 6½ 
|-
| 4 ||  || 6½ 
|-
| 5 ||  || 6½ 
|}

References

External links
  European Youth Chess Championship 2018 official page
  European Youth Chess Championship G-08 (2018) in chess-results.com
  European Youth Chess Championship G-10 (2018) in chess-results.com
  European Youth Chess Championship G-12 (2018) in chess-results.com
  European Youth Chess Championship G-14 (2018) in chess-results.com
  European Youth Chess Championship G-16 (2018) in chess-results.com
  European Youth Chess Championship G-18 (2018) in chess-results.com
  European Youth Chess Championship O-08 (2018) in chess-results.com
  European Youth Chess Championship O-10 (2018) in chess-results.com
  European Youth Chess Championship O-12 (2018) in chess-results.com
  European Youth Chess Championship O-14 (2018) in chess-results.com
  European Youth Chess Championship O-16 (2018) in chess-results.com
  European Youth Chess Championship O-18 (2018) in chess-results.com

2018
2018 in chess
Sports competitions in Riga
2018 in Latvian sport
2018 in youth sport
Chess in Latvia
International sports competitions hosted by Latvia
August 2018 sports events in Europe